Quhijan (also Romanized as Qūhījān; also known as Gudzhan, Gūjān, and Qūh Jān) is a village in Darram Rural District, in the Central District of Tarom County, Zanjan Province, Iran. At the 2006 census, its population was 18, in 6 families.

References 

Populated places in Tarom County